The 2010–11 Montreal Canadiens season was the franchise's 102nd overall season and its 94th since joining the National Hockey League (NHL). The Canadiens finished sixth overall in the Eastern Conference before losing to the eventual Stanley Cup champions, the Boston Bruins, in the Eastern Conference Quarterfinals of the 2011 Stanley Cup playoffs.

Off-season
On September 29, 2010, the Canadiens named forward Brian Gionta team captain.

Regular season
The Canadiens opened their season with a road game against long-time rival Toronto Maple Leafs on October 7. The home opener was on October 13 against the Tampa Bay Lightning.

The Canadiens were the most penalized team in the league with 327 power-play opportunities against.

Playoffs
The Canadiens attempted to win the Stanley Cup for the first time since 1993. Their 2010 Stanley Cup playoffs run was their most successful since their 1993 Stanley Cup, going to the Eastern Conference Final, but losing to the Philadelphia Flyers in five games. On April 5, 2011, the Canadiens qualified for the 2011 Stanley Cup playoffs with a 2–1 overtime victory against the Chicago Blackhawks. On April 9, 2011, it was determined that the Canadiens would play the Boston Bruins in the first round of the playoffs.

Schedule and results

Pre-season 

|- style="background:#fbb;"
| 1 || September 22 || Boston Bruins || 4–2 || Montreal Canadiens || || Price, Sanford || 0–1–0 ||
|- style="background:#cfc;"
| 2 || September 24 || Ottawa Senators || 2–4 || Montreal Canadiens || || Mayer || 1–1–0||
|- style="background:#fbb;"
| 3 || September 25 || Montreal Canadiens || 2–6 || Ottawa Senators || || Price || 1–2–0 ||
|- style="background:#cfc;"
| 4 || September 26 || Minnesota Wild || 3–4 || Montreal Canadiens || || Auld || 2–2–0 ||
|- style="background:#cfc;"
| 5 || September 27 || Florida Panthers || 2–6 || Montreal Canadiens || || Price || 3–2–0 ||
|- style="background:#fbb;"
| 6 || September 30 || Buffalo Sabres || 5–3 || Montreal Canadiens || || Auld || 3–3–0 ||
|- style="background:#cfc;"
| 7 || October 2 (in Quebec City, QC) || Montreal Canadiens || 7–2 || New York Islanders (SS) || || Price || 4–3–0 ||
|- style="text-align:center;"
| colspan=11| (SS) = Split-squad games.
|-

Regular season

|-  style="text-align:center; background:#fcc;"
| 1 || October 7 || Toronto Maple Leafs || 2–3 || Price || Air Canada Centre || 19,646 || 0–1–0 || 0 ||
|- style="background:#cfc;"
| 2 || October 9 || Pittsburgh Penguins || 3–2 || Price || Consol Energy Center || 18,106 || 1–1–0 || 2 ||
|- style="background: #e1e1e1;"
| 3 || October 13 || Tampa Bay Lightning || 3–4 OT || Price || Bell Centre || 21,273 || 1–1–1 || 3 ||
|-  style="text-align:center; background:#cfc;"
| 4 || October 15 || Buffalo Sabres || 2–1 || Price || HSBC Arena || 17,264 || 2–1–1 || 5 ||
|-  style="text-align:center; background:#cfc;"
| 5 || October 16 || Ottawa Senators || 4–3 || Price || Bell Centre || 21,273 || 3–1–1 || 7 ||
|-  style="text-align:center; background:#fcc;"
| 6 || October 21 || New Jersey Devils || 0–3 || Price || Bell Centre || 21,273 || 3–2–1 || 7 ||
|-  style="text-align:center; background:#cfc;"
| 7 || October 23 || Ottawa Senators || 3–0 || Price || Scotiabank Place || 20,301 || 4–2–1  || 9 ||
|-  style="text-align:center; background:#cfc;"
| 8 || October 25 || Phoenix Coyotes || 3–2 OT || Price || Bell Centre || 21,273 || 5–2–1 || 11 ||
|-  style="text-align:center; background:#cfc;"
| 9 || October 27 || New York Islanders || 5–3 || Price || Bell Centre || 21,273 || 6–2–1 || 13 ||
|-  style="text-align:center; background:#cfc;"
| 10 || October 29 || New York Islanders || 3–1 || Auld || Nassau Coliseum || 11,922 || 7–2–1  || 15 ||
|-  style="text-align:center; background:#fcc;"
| 11 || October 30 || Florida Panthers || 1–3 || Price || Bell Centre || 21,273 || 7–3–1 || 15 ||
|-

|-  style="text-align:center; background:#fcc;"
| 12 || November 2 || Columbus Blue Jackets || 0–3 || Price || Nationwide Arena || 18,500 || 7–4–1 || 15 ||
|-  style="text-align:center; background:#cfc;"
| 13 || November 5 || Buffalo Sabres || 3–2 || Price || HSBC Arena || 18,026 || 8–4–1  || 17 ||
|-  style="text-align:center; background:#fcc;"
| 14 || November 6 || Ottawa Senators || 2–3 || Price || Bell Centre || 21,273 || 8–5–1  || 17 ||
|-  style="text-align:center; background:#cfc;"
| 15 || November 9 || Vancouver Canucks || 2–0 || Price || Bell Centre || 21,273  || 9–5–1  || 19 ||
|-  style="text-align:center; background:#cfc;"
| 16 || November 11 || Boston Bruins || 3–1 || Price || TD Garden || 17,565 || 10–5–1 || 21 ||
|-  style="text-align:center; background:#cfc;"
| 17 || November 13 || Carolina Hurricanes || 7–2 || Price || Bell Centre || 21,273  || 11–5–1 || 23 ||
|-  style="text-align:center; background:#cfc;"
| 18 || November 16 || Philadelphia Flyers || 3–0 || Price || Bell Centre || 21,273  || 12–5–1  || 25 ||
|-  style="text-align:center; background:#fcc;"
| 19 || November 18 || Nashville Predators || 0–3 || Price || Bell Centre || 21,273 || 12–6–1 || 25 ||
|-  style="text-align:center; background:#cfc;"
| 20 || November 20 || Toronto Maple Leafs || 2–0 || Price || Bell Centre || 21,273 || 13–6–1  || 27 ||
|-  style="text-align:center; background:#fcc;"
| 21 || November 22 || Philadelphia Flyers || 2–3 || Price || Wachovia Center || 19,753 || 13–7–1 || 27 ||
|-  style="text-align:center; background:#cfc;"
| 22 || November 24 || Los Angeles Kings || 4–1 || Price || Bell Centre || 21,273 || 14–7–1 || 29 ||
|-  style="text-align:center; background:#fcc;"
| 23 || November 26 || Atlanta Thrashers || 0–3 || Auld || Philips Arena || 13,068 || 14–8–1 || 29 ||
|-  style="text-align:center; background:#cfc;"
| 24 || November 27 || Buffalo Sabres || 3–1 || Price || Bell Centre || 21,273 || 15–8–1  || 31 ||
|-

|- style="background: #e1e1e1;"
| 25 || December 1 || Edmonton Oilers || 3–4 OT || Price || Bell Centre || 21,273 || 15–8–2 || 32 ||
|-  style="text-align:center; background:#cfc;"
| 26 || December 2 || New Jersey Devils || 5–1 || Price || Prudential Center || 11,434 || 16–8–2 || 34 ||
|-  style="text-align:center; background:#cfc;"
| 27 || December 4 || San Jose Sharks || 3–1 || Price || Bell Centre || 21,273 || 17–8–2 || 36 ||
|-  style="text-align:center; background:#cfc;"
| 28 || December 7 || Ottawa Senators || 4–1 || Price || Bell Centre || 21,273 || 18–8–2 || 38 ||
|-  style="text-align:center; background:#fcc;"
| 29 || December 10 || Detroit Red Wings || 2–4 || Price || Joe Louis Arena || 20,066 || 18–9–2 || 38 ||
|-  style="text-align:center; background:#fcc;"
| 30 || December 11 || Toronto Maple Leafs || 1–3 || Auld || Air Canada Centre || 19,656 || 18–10–2 || 38 ||
|-  style="text-align:center; background:#fcc;"
| 31 || December 15 || Philadelphia Flyers || 3–5 || Price || Bell Centre || 21,273 || 18–11–2  || 38 ||
|-  style="text-align:center; background:#cfc;"
| 32 || December 16 || Boston Bruins || 4–3 || Price || Bell Centre || 21,273  || 19–11–2  || 40 ||
|-  style="text-align:center; background:#fcc;"
| 33 || December 19 || Colorado Avalanche || 2–3 || Price || Pepsi Center || 18,007  || 19–12–2 || 40 ||
|-  style="text-align:center; background:#fcc;"
| 34 || December 21 || Dallas Stars || 2–5 || Price || American Airlines Center || 17,805 || 19–13–2 || 40 ||
|-  style="text-align:center; background:#cfc;"
| 35 || December 23 || Carolina Hurricanes || 3–2 || Price || RBC Center || 16,981 || 20–13–2 || 42 ||
|-  style="text-align:center; background:#fcc;"
| 36 || December 26 || New York Islanders || 1–4 || Price || Nassau Coliseum || 3,136 || 20–14–2 || 42 ||
|-  style="text-align:center; background:#fcc;"
| 37 || December 28 || Washington Capitals || 0–3 || Price || Verizon Center || 18,398 || 20–15–2 || 42 ||
|-  style="text-align:center; background:#fcc;"
| 38 || December 30 || Tampa Bay Lightning || 1–4 || Price || St. Pete Times Forum || 20,191  || 20–16–2 || 42 ||
|-  style="text-align:center; background:#cfc;"
| 39 || December 31 || Florida Panthers || 3–2 OT || Auld || BankAtlantic Center || 20,072  || 21–16–2 || 44  ||
|-

|- style="background: #e1e1e1;"
| 40 || January 2 || Atlanta Thrashers || 3–4 OT || Price || Bell Centre || 21,273 || 21–16–3 || 45 ||
|-  style="text-align:center; background:#cfc;"
| 41 || January 6 || Pittsburgh Penguins || 2–1 SO || Price || Bell Centre || 21,273 || 22–16–3 || 47 ||
|-  style="text-align:center; background:#cfc;"
| 42 || January 8 || Boston Bruins || 3–2 OT || Price || Bell Centre || 21,273 || 23–16–3  || 49 ||
|-  style="text-align:center; background:#cfc;"
| 43 || January 11 || New York Rangers || 2–1 || Auld || Madison Square Garden || 18,200  || 24–16–3  || 51 ||
|-  style="text-align:center; background:#fcc;"
| 44 || January 12 || Pittsburgh Penguins || 2–5|| Price || Bell Centre || 21,273 || 24–17–3 || 51 ||
|-  style="text-align:center; background:#cfc;"
| 45 || January 15 || New York Rangers || 3–2 || Price || Bell Centre || 21,273 || 25–17–3 || 53 ||
|-  style="text-align:center; background:#cfc;"
| 46 || January 17 || Calgary Flames || 5–4 OT || Price || Bell Centre || 21,273  || 26–17–3  || 55 ||
|- style="background: #e1e1e1;"
| 47 || January 18 || Buffalo Sabres || 1–2 OT || Price || HSBC Arena || 18,225 || 26–17–4 || 56 ||
|-  style="text-align:center; background:#cfc;"
| 48 || January 21 || Ottawa Senators || 7–1 || Price || Scotiabank Place || 20,337 || 27–17–4  || 58 ||
|- style="background: #e1e1e1;"
| 49 || January 22 || Anaheim Ducks || 3–4 SO || Price || Bell Centre || 21,273  || 27–17–5 || 59 ||
|-  style="text-align:center; background:#fcc;"
| 50 || January 25 || Philadelphia Flyers || 2–5 || Price || Wells Fargo Center || 19,878 || 27–18–5  || 59 ||
|-

|-  style="text-align:center; background:#cfc;"
| 51 || February 1 || Washington Capitals || 3–2 SO || Price || Verizon Center || 18,398 || 28–18–5 || 61 ||
|-  style="text-align:center; background:#cfc;"
| 52 || February 2 || Florida Panthers || 3–2 || Auld || Bell Centre || 21,273  || 29–18–5 || 63 ||
|-  style="text-align:center; background:#cfc;"
| 53 || February 5 || New York Rangers || 2–0 || Price || Bell Centre || 21,273 || 30–18–5  || 65 ||
|-  style="text-align:center; background:#fcc;"
| 54 || February 6 || New Jersey Devils || 1–4 || Price || Bell Centre || 21,273  || 30–19–5 || 65 ||
|-  style="text-align:center; background:#fcc;"
| 55 || February 9 || Boston Bruins || 6–8 || Price || TD Garden || 17,565 || 30–20–5 || 65 ||
|- style="background: #e1e1e1;"
| 56 || February 10 || New York Islanders || 3–4 SO || Auld || Bell Centre || 21,273  || 30–20–6 || 66 ||
|-  style="text-align:center; background:#cfc;"
| 57 || February 12 || Toronto Maple Leafs || 3–0 || Price || Bell Centre || 21,273 || 31–20–6 || 68 ||
|- style="background: #e1e1e1;"
| 58 || February 15 || Buffalo Sabres || 2–3 SO || Price || Bell Centre || 21,273  || 31–20–7 || 69 ||
|-  style="text-align:center; background:#fcc;"
| 59 || February 17 || Edmonton Oilers || 1–4 || Price || Rexall Place || 16,839 || 31–21–7 || 69 ||
|-  style="text-align:center; background:#fcc;"
| 60 || February 20 || Calgary Flames || 0–4 || Price || McMahon Stadium || 41,022 || 31–22–7 || 69 ||
|-  style="text-align:center; background:#cfc;"
| 61 || February 22 || Vancouver Canucks || 3–2 || Price || Rogers Arena || 18,860  || 32–22–7 || 71 ||
|-  style="text-align:center; background:#fcc;"
| 62 || February 24 || Toronto Maple Leafs || 4–5 || Price || Bell Centre || 21,273  || 32–23–7 || 71 ||
|-  style="text-align:center; background:#cfc;"
| 63 || February 26 || Carolina Hurricanes || 4–3 || Auld || Bell Centre || 21,273 || 33–23–7  || 73 ||
|-

|-  style="text-align:center; background:#cfc;"
| 64 || March 1 || Atlanta Thrashers || 3–1 || Price || Philips Arena || 11,156 || 34–23–7 || 75 ||
|-  style="text-align:center; background:#cfc;"
| 65 || March 3 || Florida Panthers || 4–0 || Price || BankAtlantic Center || 19,722 || 35–23–7 || 77 ||
|-  style="text-align:center; background:#cfc;"
| 66 || March 5 || Tampa Bay Lightning || 4–2 || Price || St. Pete Times Forum || 20,274 || 36–23–7 || 79 ||
|-  style="text-align:center; background:#cfc;"
| 67 || March 8 || Boston Bruins || 4–1 || Price || Bell Centre || 21,273 || 37–23–7 || 81 ||
|-  style="text-align:center; background:#fcc;"
| 68 || March 10 || St. Louis Blues || 1–4 || Price || Scottrade Center || 19,150  || 37–24–7  || 81 ||
|-  style="text-align:center; background:#cfc;"
| 69 || March 12 || Pittsburgh Penguins || 3–0 || Price || Consol Energy Center || 18,087 || 38–24–7 || 83 ||
|-  style="text-align:center; background:#fcc;"
| 70 || March 15 || Washington Capitals || 2–4 || Price || Bell Centre || 21,273 || 38–25–7 || 83 ||
|-  style="text-align:center; background:#cfc;"
| 71 || March 17 || Tampa Bay Lightning || 3–2 SO || Price || Bell Centre || 21,273 || 39–25–7  || 85 ||
|-  style="text-align:center; background:#fcc;"
| 72 || March 18 || New York Rangers || 3–6 || Price || Madison Square Garden || 18,200  || 39–26–7 || 85 ||
|-  style="text-align:center; background:#cfc;"
| 73 || March 20 || Minnesota Wild || 8–1 || Auld || Xcel Energy Center || 18,595 || 40–26–7 || 87 ||
|-  style="text-align:center; background:#fcc;"
| 74 || March 22 || Buffalo Sabres || 0–2 || Price || Bell Centre || 21,273 || 40–27–7  || 87 ||
|-  style="text-align:center; background:#fcc;"
| 75 || March 24 || Boston Bruins || 0–7 || Price || TD Garden || 17,565 || 40–28–7 || 87 ||
|-  style="text-align:center; background:#fcc;"
| 76 || March 26 || Washington Capitals || 0–2 || Price || Bell Centre || 21,273 || 40–29–7 || 87 ||
|-  style="text-align:center; background:#cfc;"
| 77 || March 29 || Atlanta Thrashers || 3–1 || Price || Bell Centre || 21,273 || 41–29–7  || 89 ||
|-  style="text-align:center; background:#fcc;"
| 78 || March 30 || Carolina Hurricanes || 2–6 || Price || RBC Center || 18,701 || 41–30–7 || 89 ||
|-

|-  style="text-align:center; background:#cfc;"
| 79 || April 2 || New Jersey Devils || 3–1 || Price || Prudential Center || 17,625  || 42–30–7 || 91 ||
|-  style="text-align:center; background:#cfc;"
| 80 || April 5 || Chicago Blackhawks || 2–1 OT || Price || Bell Centre || 21,273 || 43–30–7  || 93 ||
|-  style="text-align:center; background:#e1e1e1;"
| 81 || April 7 || Ottawa Senators || 2–3 OT || Auld || Scotiabank Place || 19,809 || 43–30–8 || 94 ||
|-  style="text-align:center; background:#cfc;"
| 82 || April 9 || Toronto Maple Leafs || 4–1 || Price || Air Canada Centre || 19,676 || 44–30–8 || 96 ||
|-

|Legend:

Playoffs

|-  style="text-align:center; background:#cfc;"
| 1 || April 14 || Montreal Canadiens || 2–0 || Boston Bruins ||  || Price || 17,565 || Canadiens lead 1–0 ||
|-  style="text-align:center; background:#cfc;"
| 2 || April 16 || Montreal Canadiens || 3–1 || Boston Bruins || || Price || 17,565 || Canadiens lead 2–0 ||
|-  style="text-align:center; background:#fcc;"
| 3 || April 18 || Boston Bruins || 4–2 || Montreal Canadiens || || Price || 21,273 || Canadiens lead 2–1 ||
|-  style="text-align:center; background:#fcc;"
| 4 || April 21 || Boston Bruins || 5–4 || Montreal Canadiens || 1OT || Price || 21,273 || Series tied 2–2 ||
|-  style="text-align:center; background:#fcc;"
| 5 || April 23 || Montreal Canadiens || 1–2 || Boston Bruins || 2OT || Price || 17,565 || Bruins lead 3–2 ||
|-  style="text-align:center; background:#cfc;"
| 6 || April 26 || Boston Bruins || 1–2 || Montreal Canadiens || || Price || 21,273 || Series tied 3–3 ||
|-  style="text-align:center; background:#fcc;"
| 7 || April 27 || Montreal Canadiens || 3–4 || Boston Bruins || OT || Price || 17,565 || Bruins win 4–3 ||
|-

|Legend:

Standings

Divisional standings

Conference standings

Player statistics

Skaters
Note: GP = Games played; G = Goals; A = Assists; Pts = Points; +/− = Plus/minus; PIM = Penalty minutes

Goaltenders
Note: GP = Games played; TOI = Time on ice (minutes); W = Wins; L = Losses; OT = Overtime losses; GA = Goals against; GAA= Goals against average; SA= Shots against; SV= Saves; Sv% = Save percentage; SO= Shutouts

†Denotes player spent time with another team before joining Canadiens. Stats reflect time with Canadiens only.
‡Traded mid-season. Stats reflect time with Canadiens only.

Awards and records

Milestones

Awards

Transactions 

The Canadiens have been involved in the following transactions during the 2010–11 season.

Trades

Free agents acquired

Free agents lost

Lost via retirement

Player signings

Draft picks 
Montreal's picks at the 2010 NHL Entry Draft in Los Angeles, California.

Farm teams

Hamilton Bulldogs 
The Hamilton Bulldogs remain Montreal's top affiliate in the American Hockey League in 2010–11.

Wheeling Nailers 
Montreal signed an affiliation agreement with the Wheeling Nailers of the ECHL for 2010–11, succeeding the Cincinnati Cyclones.

Broadcasting

See also 
 2010–11 NHL season

References 

Montreal Canadiens seasons
Montreal Canadiens season, 2010-11
Montreal